Fernvale may refer to:
Fernvale, New South Wales, a town in Australia
Fernvale, Queensland, a town in Australia
 Fernvale, Singapore, a precinct of the Sengkang district, located in north-eastern Singapore 
Fernvale LRT station, the light rail transit station that serves it
 Fernvale, Tennessee, an unincorporated community in the United States